Bolshezemelskaya Tundra (Russian: Большеземельская тундра) is a hilly lowland in the Timan-Pechora Basin in northwestern Russia on the coast of the Barents Sea, between the Pechora and Usa rivers and the Pay-Khoy Range of the Ural Mountains. It covers more than 

It is situated within the territory of the Nenets Autonomous Okrug and the Komi Republic. The topography of the Bolshezemelskaya Tundra is dominated by hills and moraine ridges composed of sandy till. The tundra lies in the subarctic climate zone. Frosts also occur in the summer months. 

The Bolshezemelskaya Tundra has a dense river network, which consists mainly of the tributaries of the Pechora and the Usa rivers. There are many lakes in the upper sections of the main rivers. Much of the lowland is covered with permafrost. The plant cover is tundra, mainly mosses and prostrate shrubs. The southern part of the lowland is a forest-tundra. South of the Arctic Circle, taiga predominates. The native population of Izhma Komi is engaged in reindeer herding. Part of the Bolshezemelskaya Tundra area is part of the Pechora Coal Basin, and there exist large deposits of crude oil and natural gas discovered by the geologist Georgy Chernov.

References

Landforms of Arkhangelsk Oblast
Tundra ecoregions